Conospermum densiflorum, commonly known as crown smokebush, is a shrub endemic to Western Australia.

It blooms between September and January producing cream-white-blue flowers.

It is found in low-lying areas in the Wheatbelt region of Western Australia where it grows in gravelly-clay soils often over laterite.

References

External links

Eudicots of Western Australia
densiflorum
Endemic flora of Western Australia
Plants described in 1839